Bulboaca  is a commune and village in the Anenii Noi District of the Republic of Moldova.

References

Communes of Anenii Noi District
Tighina County (Romania)
Ținutul Nistru